Joseph Blackburn  McGrew (28 January 1829 – 30 December 1897) was a member of the Wisconsin State Assembly and the Wisconsin State Senate.

Biography
McGrew was born in Wayne Township, Jefferson County, Ohio. He moved to Richland County, Wisconsin in 1855.

Career
McGrew was a member of the Assembly in 1875 and of the Senate from 1880 to 1881. Previously, he was Chairman of the Richland, Richland County, Wisconsin Board and the Richland County Board. Additionally, McGrew was Sheriff of Richland County in 1863. He was a Republican.

References

1829 births
1897 deaths
People from Jefferson County, Ohio
People from Richland County, Wisconsin
Republican Party Wisconsin state senators
Republican Party members of the Wisconsin State Assembly
Wisconsin sheriffs
19th-century American politicians